Bactrocythara obtusa is an extinct species of sea snail, a marine gastropod mollusk in the family Mangeliidae.

Description
The length of the shell attains 5.4 mm, its diameter 1.9 mm.

Distribution
This extinct species was found in Pliocene strata of Jamaica; age range: 3.6 to 2.588 Ma

References

 Guppy, Robert John Lechmere. Descriptions of Tertiary fossils from the Antillean region. Vol. 19. No. 1110. US Government Printing Office, 1896.
 W. P. Woodring. 1928. Miocene Molluscs from Bowden, Jamaica. Part 2: Gastropods and discussion of results . Contributions to the Geology and Palaeontology of the West Indies
 A. J. W. Hendy, D. P. Buick, K. V. Bulinski, C. A. Ferguson, and A. I. Miller. 2008. Unpublished census data from Atlantic coastal plain and circum-Caribbean Neogene assemblages and taxonomic opinions.

obtusa